He Ping (born November 1957) is a general of the Chinese People's Liberation Army (PLA). He has been Political Commissar of the Eastern Theater Command since September 2017.

Biography
He Ping was born in November 1957 in Nanchong, Sichuan Province.

He spent most of his career in the former Chengdu Military Region. In 2008 he was appointed Director of the Political Department of the 14th Group Army, and attained the rank of major general the next year. He became Deputy Political Commissar of the 14th Army in 2011, and deputy director of the Political Department of the Chengdu MR and Political Commissar of the Joint Logistics Department of the Chengdu MR in 2013. In July 2014 he was appointed Political Commissar of the Intelligence Department of the former PLA General Staff Department.

In 2016, He was appointed Director of the Political Department of the newly established Western Theater Command. In September 2017, he was transferred and promoted to Political Commissar of the Eastern Theater Command, succeeding General Zheng Weiping.

In October 2017, he was elected as a member of the 19th Central Committee of the Chinese Communist Party.

References

1957 births
Living people
People from Nanchong
People's Liberation Army generals from Sichuan
Members of the 19th Central Committee of the Chinese Communist Party